Tonic Trouble is a 1999 action-adventure game developed by Ubi Soft Montreal and published by Ubi Soft. The game follows janitor Ed, who drops a container of unidentified fluid from his spaceship to Earth, transforming the planet into a mutated version of itself. Drunkard Grögh drinks from the container and is granted powers that lead him to conquer Earth. Assuming the role of Ed, the player is tasked with solving puzzles and defeating enemies to acquire the tools to conquer Grögh and repossess the container to create an antidote.

Tonic Trouble was conceptualized by Michel Ancel and developed by a team of around 120 people, starting pre-production in June 1996. After multiple delays, the game was released for Nintendo 64 in August 1999, with a Windows version following that December. A Game Boy Color adaptation was made by RFX Interactive and released in Europe in 2000. Tonic Trouble received a mixed response from critics, who approved of the controls, score, level design, and graphics, but criticized the camera system, gameplay, visuals, and its derivative nature. The game sold 1.1 million copies.

Gameplay 

Tonic Trouble is an action-adventure game played from a third-person view. The playable character, Ed, navigates three-dimensional environments through platforming and entering portals, while wielding a peashooter (used in a first-person perspective); new gadgets are rewarded as more levels are completed. Gadgets are created by a mad doctor character, who builds the peashooter, a bow tie that enables Ed to fly, a diving helmet for underwater exploration, a belt that functions as a cloaking device by letting him take the appearance of enemies, and a pogo stick that allows him to traverse lava and stomp open trap doors. There are six levels on the Game Boy Color version, contrary to the twelve featured in the Nintendo 64 and Windows versions.

Ed can jump, climb, fly, swim, and crawl. To unlock the ability to kick and slap enemies, he must enlarge himself into Super Ed with popcorn consumables. The health bar increases from obtaining thermometers. Ed can use a stick to beat enemies, activate switches, and pry open doorways to areas containing bonus items. Fetch quests include collecting red orbs and other items; solving puzzles can grant power-ups and help defeat enemies. Collecting bonus spheres will unlock a secret level.

Plot 
In the Nintendo 64 version, Ed, a purple alien working as a janitor on his mothership, finds himself cleaning a storage room. He starts hunting a bug, trying to squash it. Exhausted from the hunt, Ed proceeds to drink an unidentified liquid from a container, but as he spits it out onto the floor, screws come alive and open a trapdoor. The container falls through the door and down to Earth, polluting a river and causing the entire planet to mutate. Grögh, a drunkard sleeping nearby, swallows the liquid and gains supernatural powers that help him conquer Earth.

The initial story of the PC version differs. There, Ed contemplates on giving a gift to a girl he likes, but gets chased by her boyfriend to the storage room. When he learns of the liquid's mutagenic properties, he throws the container into a garbage chute from which it falls and lands on Earth. Before finding the container, Grögh gets kicked out of a bar for not paying his tab.

Shortly following the incident, Ed is recruited by resistance leader Agent Xyz to obtain the container so that an antidote can be created against the mutations. Ed takes a small spaceship to Earth to meet the inventor Doc and his daughter Suzy, who Xyz said would give aid in his mission. On his way there, he crashes into a snowy mountain, causing him to continue by sled. At the foot of the mountain, Ed takes the direct way to South Plain, where he encounters Suzy. She implores Ed to save her father, who was imprisoned by his own robot following the contamination.

Once liberated, the Doc informs Ed that before his capture, he was building a catapult that could get someone into Grögh's Castle and recover the container. However, Grögh's henchmen took the items required to finish the contraption, which the Doc instructs Ed to retrieve. The last item is stolen by an enemy called Magic Mushroom, but Ed defeats him. With the Doc's catapult completed, Ed is flung into Grögh's Castle, where he engages in battle against Grögh and wins. Ed reclaims the container, enabling him to finally remedy the infestation of Earth.

Development and release 
Tonic Trouble was conceived and initially designed by Michel Ancel, who had created Rayman in 1995. Ancel was largely inspired by the storyline of Day of the Tentacle and the world-travelling mechanic from The Legend of Zelda: A Link to the Past. Starting pre-production in June 1996, Tonic Trouble was the first project to be developed by the previously established Ubi Soft Montreal, which devoted a team of sixty programmers, thirty animators, twelve level designers, twelve 3D artists, and four audio department employees. Using the engine, the developers wanted to take full advantage of Intel's newest Pentium II generation of central processing units. Tonic Trouble was one of the first games to be distributed on DVD-ROM, a rarity at the time. The additional storage of DVDs allowed Ubi Soft to include a longer introduction and more music tracks. Designer Pierre Olivier Clement stated that the design team aimed at making the player rationalize every step they took, contrary to what was done in games like Duke Nukem and Quake. Furthermore, they opted to differentiate the game from its sister project, Rayman 2: The Great Escape, by focusing more strongly on adventure, whereas Rayman 2 relied on action. The soundtrack was created in six months by composer Eric Chevalier and five in-house sound editors.

The game was first previewed as Ubi Soft's first Nintendo 64 title in Electronic Gaming Monthlys January 1997 issue, under the working title "HED (then also the protagonist's name), and later listed on Ubi Soft's website as Ed. By that time, it had already been renamed eight times. The game was announced by Ubi Soft in April 1997, with a release slated for December 1997. The company held an online contest to determine the final name; the name "Tonic Trouble" was chosen by late April. It premiered as a Nintendo 64 and Windows title at June 1997's Electronic Entertainment Expo (E3), revealing it would have four-player cooperative multiplayer and a 64DD add-on once the cartridge version had been released, however, representatives later stated an unwillingness to focus on the 64DD, explaining that the device was still in development and puzzle-solving gameplay was incompatible with multiplayer. Critics noticed early that Tonic Trouble strongly resembled the appeal of Rayman, judging from Ed's limbless design, the colourful worlds, and similar platforming gameplay, though renewed in 3D, in contrast to Raymans 2D visuals. Ubi Soft also entered into a partnership with Newman's Own in May 1998, which would see Tonic Troubles Windows include a package of Newman's Own Popcorn in the retail box, as well as Newman's Own branding on the popcorn dispensers within the game. In November 1998, Newman's Own started packing  rebate coupons for Tonic Trouble with four million boxes of its popcorn products, where the coupons would expire on 1 June 1999. For every coupon redeemed with Ubi Soft, the company was to donate  to the Hole in the Wall Gang Camp in France.

Originally scheduled for November 1997, Tonic Trouble saw multiple delays, with its release being pushed back to early 1998, then to April 1998, June 1998, Q4 1998, and 15 February 1999. According to an author at IGN, the version shown at E3 was in a rough state, lacking animation and suffering heavily from low framerates and stiff controls, though all of these issues had been resolved by the time they received a new preview copy in December 1998. From 9–11 October 1998, it was exhibited at the Tokyo Game Show (TGS) alongside Rayman 2. A critic from IGN noted that, although both showed great attention to detail, Rayman 2 looked "significantly sharper". An early version (designated the "Special Edition") was distributed as part of the software bundles shipped with graphics cards, including those of the Marvel G200-TV, Mystique 200, and Marvel G400-TV models by Matrox, and Guillemot's Maxi Gamer Phoenix. Around February 1999, it was rumoured that Tonic Trouble and Rayman 2 would be releasing for PlayStation, with that year's TGS line-up also shortlisting such versions for both games. In March 1999, Ubi Soft acquired a Dolby Pro Logic surround sound licence for usage within Tonic Trouble and Rayman 2. Tonic Trouble was released for Nintendo 64 on 31 August 1999 and Windows on 7 December 1999. An eponymous Game Boy Color counterpart was developed by RFX Interactive and first shown at France's Milia expo in February 2000. The conversion featured the same cast and story as the main game, while the gameplay was adapted from 3D to 2D. It was released for Game Boy Color the same year, exclusively in Europe; Ubi Soft did not plan to bring it to the United States.

Reception 

Tonic Trouble was met with mixed reception upon release, according to the review aggregator website GameRankings. It sold 1.1 million copies as of 2001. Electronic Gaming Monthly thought that, in terms of level design, Tonic Trouble was "a tightly developed platformer"; the control scheme was similarly praised. Game Informer wrote that the "wide variety" of gameplay and "solid" controls would be enjoyable to platformer fans. GamePro commended the musical score and sound effects, noting the puzzles as what kept the gameplay "diverse" and "challenging". Suzi Sez, reviewing the PC version for GameZone, enjoyed Tonic Troubles "stunning" 3D graphics, "great" sound effects and music, "cute and fun" storyline, and unrelenting replay value. IGNs Matt Casamassina considered the visuals to be "good", the characters and levels to be "well designed", and the music to be one of the game's strong points. IGNs Game Boy Color review of Tonic Trouble, written by Tim Jones, described the controls as "tight and responsive" and the humour and visuals as "enjoyable". Jones thought the graphics, seen as "clear" and colourful, complemented the level design, adding that the sprites boasted "excellent" and detailed animation. He felt the music was also well made. Jeffrey Adam Young of Next Generation approved of the game world and its blend of platforming, exploration, and puzzle-solving elements. In agreement with Jones, Young lauded the "responsive" controls as well as the humour. Nintendo Power appreciated that the controls made the characters and world more enjoyable. The music was said to offer a sufficient match for the graphics.

Conversely, Electronic Gaming Monthly blamed the Nintendo 64 for the visual shortcomings, criticized boss battles for their lack of difficulty, and saw the music as insignificant, while also calling the main character "annoying" and camera system "confusing". Game Informer disliked the graphics and noted some camera problems. GamePro disparaged the "sparse textures" and "low-res and fuzzy" characters, whose voices were regarded as "forced". Their primary issue was with the controls for being incongruent with the camera. Johnny Liu of GameRevolution gave Ed the award for "Worst Video Game Character of 1999", citing an "awful performance in the equally bad game". He slighted the "inane" story and unrefined controls, agreeing with other critics on the "irritating" camera angles and "jumbled" visuals. VideoGames.coms Ben Stahl declared Tonic Trouble "a shining example of how not to do a platform game". He termed most of the colours of the environments as "an eyesore", the graphics as "simply horrible", and the level design as "bland and unoriginal". Disagreeing with GamePro, the soundtrack was rather interpreted as "cheesy" and of low production value. Stahl expressed disdain for the lack of sound effects, felt the gameplay was "downright lame", and also met hardship with the camera. Casamassina dubbed Tonic Trouble the S. S. Minnow to Rayman 2s Love Boat, observing the "generic feel" as its largest obstacle. Echoing Stahl, Casamassina found there to be too few sound effects. Reviewing the game on PC, Vincent Lopez of IGN compared the game to Rayman 2 like Casamassina, faulting Tonic Trouble for being too much like past platformers. The camera was subject to reproval for how it would inherently worsen the gameplay experience, adding to his dissatisfaction with the "wonky" controls. Jones derided the game's "shamelessly derivative" nature. Nintendo Power complained about certain areas where "hit detection" failed to give effect.

Notes

References

External links 
 
 

1999 video games
3D platform games
Action-adventure games
Game Boy Color games
Nintendo 64 games
RFX Interactive games
Single-player video games
Ubisoft games
Video games about extraterrestrial life
Video games developed in Canada
Video games with alternative versions
Windows games